The Ministry of Defence of Moldova is one of the fourteen ministries of the Government of Moldova. It is the main executive body responsible for the managing of the Armed Forces of Moldova.

History

Pre-history 
During the era of the Moldavian Democratic Republic, defence policy was handled by the Director General for Armed Forces, who was a member of the Council of Directors General. The following served in this position over the course of the republic's existence:

 Major Teodor Cojocaru (7 – 11 December 1917)
 Gherman Pântea (11 December 1917 – ?) 
 Constantin Brăescu (?)
In addition, in the Bessarabian Soviet Socialist Republic, the position of People's Commissar of War in the Sovnarkom was occupied by Boris Gumpert.

Modern ministry 
It was founded on 5 February 1992. The official flag of the Ministry of Defense was established by Presidential Decree on 17 June 2014.

Functions
The Ministry of Defense is currently responsible for carrying out the following duties:

 Organization and control of the Moldovan National Army
 Representing the armed forces in the cabinet
 Reporting to the Government of Moldova on military affairs
 Executing the military policy of the government and the President of Moldova
 Management of all military related activities and military operations
 Oversight of military construction
 Development of communication and transport systems
 Provision of military storage
 Management of military offices and institutions
 Administration of military academies
 Welfare of retired military personnel
 Equipping the armed forces with necessary technology
 Corresponding with foreign defence ministries

Organizational structure

Leadership
 Minister of Defence – Anatolie Nosatîi 
 Chief of the General Staff – Brigadier General Eduard Ohladciuc
 Secretary General – Igor Cutie
 State Secretary for Defense Policy and National Army Reform – Aurel Fondos
 Secretary of State for Development of Human Resources Policies, Military Education and Planning of Resources – Sergiu Plop

The cabinet of the Minister of Defense assists the defense minister in organizing/managing the main subordinate institutions of the ministry. The cabinet is also responsible for organizing meetings and coordinating protocol.

Departments and subordinates
The ministry has the following structure
 Center of Military History and Culture
 Central Sports Club of the Army
 Military Mass-Media Center
 Consultative Diagnostic Center
 Preventive Medical Center
 Military Band Service
 Presidential Band of the Republic of Moldova – Chișinău 
 Band of the 1st Infantry Motorized Brigade – Bălți
 Band of the 2nd Infantry Motorized Brigade – Chișinău
 Band of the 3rd Infantry Motorized Brigade – Cahul
 Alexandru cel Bun Military Academy of the Armed Forces
 Agency for Ensuring Resources and Administration of Patrimony
Agency for Military Science and Memory
 Military Inspectorate of the Ministry of Defense
 Central Commission of Military Medical Expertise (CCMME)
 Central Military Hospital (CMH)

Military bands of Moldova fall under the command of the music service of the Moldovan National Army, which is currently under the supervision of the defense ministry. These bands follow the Russian and Romanian military tradition for military bands. The military bands of the army have performed and participated in international music festivals since 1997. The military bands of the National Army's Chisinau Garrison include: the Presidential Band, with the army's 1st, 2nd, and 3rd Motorized Infantry Brigade also maintaining their own military bands.

General Staff
 General Staff (J1)
 Personnel Directorate (J2)
 Operations Directorate (J3)
 Directorate of Logistics (J4)
 Strategic Planning Directorate (J5)
 Communication and Information Systems Directorate (J6)
 Doctrine and Joint Training Directorate (J7)
 Management, Coordination and Monitoring Directorate
 Law Department
 Health Department
 Secţia poliţie militară
 Economic and Financial Department
 Secretariat and Internal Management Department
 Legal Department
 Human Resources Management Department
 Defense Policy and Defense Planning Division
 General Inspection Directorate
 Public Relations Service

List of Ministers

See also
Cabinet of Moldova
Chief of the General Staff (Moldova)
Ministry of Defense (Ukraine)
Ministry of National Defense (Romania)

References

External links
 Official Website

Defence
Moldova
Ministry of Defence (Moldova)